Soy is the twelfth album of Puerto Rican Salsa singer Víctor Manuelle. The album was released on June 10, 2008. It produced two singles, "Yo No Se Perdonarte" and "No Soy Quien".

Track listings 
Yo Te Quería Querer
Yo No Sé Perdonarte (Salsa)
Dime (Salsa)
El Amor Es Un Casino (ft. Tego Calderón)
No Soy Quién (Salsa)
Mi Salsa
No Me Niegues la Vida
Mi Mejor Amiga
No Soy Quién (Ballad)
Dime (Ballad)
Yo No Sé Perdonarte (Ballad)

Singles 
"Yo No Se Perdonarte"
"No Soy Quien"

Charts

Awards/Nominations

See also
List of number-one Billboard Tropical Albums from the 2000s

2008 albums
Víctor Manuelle albums